Rhodium oxide can refer to:
Rhodium(III) oxide, Rh2O3
Rhodium(IV) oxide, RhO2